Kangyang (Mandarin: 康扬镇) is a town in Jainca County, Huangnan Tibetan Autonomous Prefecture, Qinghai, China. In 2010, Kangyang had a total population of 8,182 people: 4,023 males and 4,159 females: 2,096 under 14 years old, 5,584 aged between 15 and 64 and 502 over 65 years old.

References 
 

Huangnan Tibetan Autonomous Prefecture
Township-level divisions of Qinghai